Pool C of the 2007 Rugby World Cup began on 8 September and concluded on 29 September 2007. The pool was composed of Italy, New Zealand, Romania and Scotland and World Cup debutants Portugal.

Overview
New Zealand were assured of first place in the pool after only three rounds of matches, having secured the maximum of five points from each of their matches. Over their four matches, the All Blacks established a new points record for the pool stage with 309 points.

Italy were unable to carry their strong Six Nations form into the World Cup, and were knocked out by a narrow margin. Scotland qualified for the quarter-finals as pool runners-up.

All times local (UTC+2)

New Zealand vs Italy

Note: Doug Howlett's three tries in this match brought him level with Christian Cullen as New Zealand's all-time highest try scorer, with 46.

Scotland vs Portugal

Italy vs Romania

New Zealand vs Portugal

Scotland vs Romania

Note: With an attendance of 31,222, Scotland vs Romania was the lowest-attended match in Pool C, despite Scotland playing at home.

Italy vs Portugal

Scotland vs New Zealand

Note: Doug Howlett's two tries in this match brought his total in internationals to 48, a new try-scoring record for New Zealand.

Romania vs Portugal

New Zealand vs Romania

Scotland vs Italy

External links
Pool C at rugbyworldcup.com

Pool C
2007–08 in Italian rugby union
2007–08 in Romanian rugby union
2007–08 in Scottish rugby union
2007 in New Zealand rugby union
rugby union